Abraham Cresques (1325–1387), whose real name was  Cresques (son of) Abraham, was a 14th-century Jewish cartographer from Palma, Majorca (then part of the Crown of Aragon).  In collaboration with his son, Jehuda Cresques,  Cresques is credited with the authorship of the celebrated Catalan Atlas of 1375.

Personal life 
A Majorcan Jew, Cresques was a master map-maker and builder of clocks, compasses, and other nautical instruments. He was a leading member of the Majorcan cartographic school.

Abraham Cresques's real name was Eliça (a.k.a. Cresques) son of Rabbi Abraham, son of Rabbi Benaviste, son of Rabbi Eliça. Eliça being the name he would have received when he came of age but known as Cresques of Abraham (Cresques being his personal name, Eliça his religious name, Abraham his patronym), but the order is often flipped in most subsequent literature. His son, Jehuda Cresques, was also a notable cartographer.

The Catalan Atlas 

In 1375, Cresques and his son Jehuda received an assignment from Prince John of Aragon (the future John I of Aragon) to make a set of nautical charts which would go beyond the normal geographic range of contemporary portolan charts to cover the East and the West, and everything that, from the Strait [of Gibraltar] leads to the West. For this job, Cresques and Jehuda would be paid 150 Aragonese golden florins, and 60 Mallorcan pounds, respectively, as it is stated in 14th-century documents from the Prince himself and his father Peter IV of Aragon. Prince John intended to present the chart to his cousin Charles (later to be Charles VI, King of France) as a gift. In that year 1375 Cresques and Jehuda drew the six charts that composed the Catalan Atlas at their house in the Jewish quarter of Palma.

Works attributed to Cresques 

The Catalan Atlas of c. 1375 is the only map that has been confidently attributed to Cresques Abraham. But researchers have suggested that five other existing maps might also be attributed to Cresques, Jehuda or some other worker in the Cresques atelier. Like the Catalan Atlas itself, these five maps (four portolan charts, one fragment of a mappa mundi), are unsigned and undated, and their date of composition estimated sometime between 1375 and 1400.

 Catalan Atlas, c. 1375, 6 panels, map from the Atlantic Ocean to China, held  at the Bibliothèque Nationale de France in Paris, France
 Venice chart, c. 1375-1400, portolan chart (missing northern Europe), held  at the Biblioteca Marciana in Venice, Italy
 Florence chart, c. 1375-1400, portolan chart (west Mediterranean only) held (Port.22) at the Biblioteca Nazionale Centrale, Florence, Italy
 Naples chart, c. 1375-1400, normal portolan chart held (ms.XII.D102) at the Biblioteca Nazionale Vittorio Emanuele III in Naples, Italy
 Istanbul map c. 1375-1400, fragment of mappa mundi, held (1828) at the Topkapi Palace in Istanbul, Turkey
 Paris chart, c. 1400, portolan chart held (AA751) at the  Bibliotheque Nationale de France in Paris, France

According to Campbell, of the four portolan charts attributed the Cresques atelier, the Naples and Paris charts are more ornate than the other two, with the Paris chart (c. 1400) in particular seeming closest to the features of the Catalan Atlas (c. 1375). However, attribution to the Cresques workshop is only tentative. As Campbell notes, "That this group of charts is closely related is clear. But it is hard to see, from the colour analysis alone, evidence to confirm that these four charts were the product of supervised work in a single atelier."

Cresques also produced an illuminated Bible with an annexed Hebrew-Catalan dictionary, known as the Farhi Bible.

See also 

 Catalan Atlas
 Majorcan cartographic school
 Compass rose
 Rhumbline network

References

External links 
Images of the whole Catalan Atlas in high resolution and Images of the whole Catalan Atlas archived and accessed 2008-03-14 Bibliothèque nationale de France
 www.cresquesproject.net—Translation in English of the works of Riera i Sans and Gabriel Llompart on the Jewish Majorcan mapmakers of the Late Middle Ages. They include very complete biographies of Cresques Abraham and his son Jafudà Cresques.

Bibliography 

 

Year of birth unknown
1387 deaths
Majorcan cartographers
14th-century people from the Kingdom of Aragon
Medieval Majorcan Jews
14th-century Jews
14th-century geographers
1325 births